David Rawl House is a historic home located at Lexington, Lexington County, South Carolina. It was built about 1854, and is a rectangular, one-story, frame cottage with board-and-batten siding.  It has a gable roof and a rear ell.  It is one of nine surviving antebellum houses in Lexington.

It was listed on the National Register of Historic Places in 1983.

In 2015, 210 Shoppe + Studio opened inside the 1854 David Rawl House and has made an emphasis to maintain the historical character as much as possible.  210 Shoppe + Studio is a unique gift shoppe that specializes in out of the ordinary gifts with a flair for the arts.  They also feature artwork and a studio by Wayne Rogers (waynerogersarchitectartist.com).

References

Houses on the National Register of Historic Places in South Carolina
Houses completed in 1854
Houses in Lexington County, South Carolina
National Register of Historic Places in Lexington County, South Carolina